The Hotel and Restaurant Workers' Union was the name of:

 Hotel and Restaurant Workers' Union (Austria)
 Hotel and Restaurant Workers' Union (Finland)
 Hotel and Restaurant Workers' Union (Norway)
 Hotel and Restaurant Workers' Union (South Africa)
 Swedish Hotel and Restaurant Workers' Union